Dysgonia triplocyma is a moth of the family Noctuidae first described by George Hampson in 1913. It is found in east Africa, including Malawi.

References

Dysgonia
Lepidoptera of Malawi
Moths of Sub-Saharan Africa